Thomas Henry Sanderson-Wells  (12 March 1871 – 1958) was a British surgeon.

Born Thomas Henry Wells in 1871, Sanderson-Wells was educated at Bloxham School, before receiving his clinical training at Middlesex Hospital. He qualified as a member of the Royal College of Surgeons and a member of the Royal College of Physicians in 1895. He served as a civil surgeon with the South African Field Force in 1901 during the Second Boer War, before settling in Weymouth. There he was appointed surgeon to the Princess Christian Hospital for Women and Children. Sanderson-Wells proceeded to study for his Bachelor of Medicine degree in London. During the First World War, Sanderson-Wells served as an officer in the Royal Army Medical Corps, also working in Gaza with the Red Cross. He was elected into the Fellowship of the Royal College of Surgeons in 1918. He was awarded an MBE in 1920 in recognition for his services in connection with work at military hospitals in the United Kingdom during the war.

Sanderon-Wells subsequently continued to work at Weymouth District Hospital until an old injury (his leg was badly burnt during experimental x-ray research early in his career) forced him to retire in 1925 from practising surgery. He was made an honorary consulting surgeon at the hospital and went on to become its vice-president.

Two prizes to his memory have been established at the University of London, both of which recognise Sanderson-Wells' work in nutrition. He married Agnes Laurie in 1906 and she died in 1950. He died without children in Wells, Somerset in 1958.

He is buried at the churchyard at Church of St Matthew, Wookey.

References

1871 births
1958 deaths
Royal Army Medical Corps officers
British Army personnel of World War I
Members of the Order of the British Empire
People educated at Bloxham School
British surgeons
Fellows of the Royal College of Surgeons
Place of birth missing
British Army personnel of the Second Boer War